Béligneux is a commune in the Ain department in eastern France.

Geography
It lies about 30 km northeast of Lyon. The commune includes part of the village of La Valbonne at the foot of the hill (the rest belongs to the neighboring commune of Balan) and the hamlet of Chânes.

Population

See also
Communes of the Ain department

References

Communes of Ain